Milton E. "Pete" Brooks (August 29, 1901 – September 3, 1956) was the winner of the first Pulitzer Prize for photography in 1942.

Biography
Brooks was born in St. Louis. He was a stocky red-headed man with an ardent boating habit. His father, James W. Brooks, was also a newspaper reporter and "desk man". Brooks was a staff photographer for The Detroit News from 1928 to 1953. Afterward, he became a commercial photographer.

Prize-winning photograph
The photograph with which Brooks won the prize was called Ford Strikers Riot. It was taken during the 1941 workers' strike at a Ford manufacturing plant, and shows strikers beating a strikebreaker, who is trying to protect himself by pulling his coat over his head and face.

Describing the circumstances surrounding the photo, Brooks said, "I took the picture quickly, hid the camera under my coat and ducked into the crowd. A lot of people would have liked to wreck that picture."

References 

20th-century American photographers
Pulitzer Prize for Photography winners
1901 births
1956 deaths
20th-century American non-fiction writers